The Close Up Foundation is a nonprofit, nonpartisan civic education organization in Washington, D.C. Established in 1971, Close Up offers programming to educate and encourage young people to participate in their civic affairs and government. About 850,000 students and teachers have participated in its programs.

History
After taking a group of American students abroad to study foreign government, Close Up founder and former State Department official Stephen A. Janger (1936-2015) noticed growing cynicism and critique of the American government among young people. As the events of the 1960s unfolded, Janger desired to help students gain a better understanding of their own government.  With his wife Kathie and his brother Stanford, Janger founded the Close Up Foundation in 1971. During its first year, Close Up facilitated its first Washington High School Program with over 500 student participants from Florida, Oklahoma, and Texas.

Programs 
Close Up programs cater to various high and middle school audiences.  Close Up also offers a program for New Americans, specialized programs for Native Americans, Teaching American History (TAH) programs for teachers, and several theme-based programs that enable participants to benefit from Washington's seasonality.

Educators use Close Up programming to enhance classroom learning. Close Up curriculum complements Common Core (C3) Framework.

High School Program 
The Washington High School Program aims to build students’ sense of political efficacy. During this six-day/five-night program students meet with elected officials on Capitol Hill, participate in structured learning activities at Washington's monuments and memorials, and engage in workshops about how the U.S. government works.

Middle School Program 
The Washington Middle School Program provides students hands-on opportunities to interact with government and history. During this four day, three-night program students explore the links between history and the problems and prospects today. Emphasis will be placed on how the actions of ordinary citizens can directly affect public policymaking.

Teacher Program 
Teachers and administrators can participate in an adult-learning program that runs parallel to student programming. The Teacher Program includes the study of some of Washington's lesser-known monuments and memorials that provide a forum for educators to share best practices with peers. Upon completion, educators can earn Graduate Credits or Continuing Education Units.

Outreach
Close Up programs have hosted students and teachers from all 50 states and Abu Dhabi, American Samoa, Canada, Commonwealth of the Northern Mariana Islands, Curaçao, Guam, Federated States of Micronesia, Puerto Rico, Republic of the Marshall Islands, Mexico, Republic of Palau and the United States Virgin Islands. Many schools send groups to Close Up every year. Additionally, many students decide to attend on their own or with friends. Programs are offered year-round, including summer.

Close Up also serves teachers and students nationwide though its mix of Washington-based and local, as well as classroom-based learning tools such as publications, lesson plans, TV series, and videos. Its flagship publication is Current Issues. Current Issues is an annual supplemental textbook that provides insightful coverage of public policy topics. Its "pro-con" format intends to stimulate debate among students and for helping students appreciate multiple points of view.

Program Components 
 Capitol Hill Day – Some groups may meet with offices of their Congressional delegation.  Students also get the opportunity to visit other sites on Capitol Hill, such as the Supreme Court, Library of Congress, and Capitol Visitors Center.
 Mock Congress – Prior to “Hill Day,” groups participate in a large group activity that uses mock legislative bills on current policy controversies and issues to help students better understand how the legislative process works through simulation. 
 Current Issues Debate – Students will deliberate upon available policy options and consider how the government should weigh and act on competing priorities.
 Domestic Issues Debate – Students explore a variety of current controversial domestic issues during this large question-and-answer session with two professionals from both a liberal and conservative background.

Notable alumni

Representative Sheila Babauta (D-Northern Mariana Islands)
Former Congressman Rob Bishop (R-UT)
Congressman David Cicilline (D-RI)
Former Congressman Carlos Curbelo (R-FL)
Former Congressman Joe Garcia (D-FL)
Congresswoman Lizzie Fletcher (D-TX)
Former Governor Brad Henry (D-OK)
Congressman Steven Horsford (D-NV)
Congressman Dusty Johnson (R-SD)
Former Secretary of Transportation Ray LaHood (R-IL)
Former Senator Mary Landrieu (D-LA)
Senator James Lankford (R-OK)
Congressman Patrick McHenry (R-NC)
Delegate Michael San Nicolas (D-GU)
Congressman Adam Smith (D-WA)
Former Secretary of Education Margaret Spellings (R)
Former White House Press Secretary Sean Spicer (R)
Congressman Bryan Steil (R-WI)
Former Congresswoman Betty Sutton (D-OH)
Senator Pat Toomey (R-PA)
Former Senator David Vitter (R-LA)
Congresswoman Ann Wagner (R-MO)
Governor Tim Waltz (D-MN)

References

External links
Close Up Foundation
35th Anniversary of Close Up on C-SPAN
Washington Post profile of Close Up
Congressional Record recognizing the 25th anniversary of Close Up
Library of C-SPAN Close Up videos
Close Up Foundation session with President Reagan
Close Up students, from Oklahoma, look under the fractured hood of democracy

Educational foundations in the United States